Osamu Kaneda (born August 31, 1949) is a director, action director and a stuntman.  He is the president and CEO of Japan Action Enterprise, and a graduate of Tokyo Designer Gakuin College.

Career

References

External links 
 
 Osamu Kaneda, at Yahoo! Movies
 Osamu Kaneda, The New York Times

Japanese film directors
1949 births
Living people
Japanese stunt performers
Place of birth missing (living people)